A fictional brand is a non-existing brand used in artistic or entertainment productions, such as paintings, books, comics, movies, TV serials, and music. The fictional brand may be designed to imitate, satirize or differentiate itself from a real corporate brand. Such a device may be required where real corporations are unwilling to license their brand names for use in the fictional work, particularly where the work holds the product in a negative light.

More recently, fictional brands have been used for commercial purposes through the process of reverse product placement. Consumer attachment to those brands in the fictional world may be leveraged through “defictionalisation” or “productisation” in the real world. It has been suggested that the fictional brands represent brand potential rather than brand reality; they are in effect, “protobrands” that can be leveraged and transformed into registered trademarks which can derive revenue for their owners through reverse product placement or, more accurately, reverse brand placement. Examples include Harry Potter’s Bertie Botts’ Every Flavour Beans, now available as real candy manufactured by the Jelly Belly Company; Duff Beer, a beer brand now available for consumption in Europe which initially appeared in The Simpsons; and Staples' Dundee Mifflin paper, from TV show, The Office.

Purposes

Works of fiction often mention or show specific brands to give more realism to the plot or scenery. Specific brands provide descriptive details that the author can use to craft a plot: a character may own a factory that manufactures a popular product, or may make a scene by demanding a particular brand; a detective may get clues from the brand of cigarettes smoked by a suspect; a film may include a commercial poster on the background, or show a package of cereal in close-up.

Real brands are often used. Sometimes a specific brand is needed due to its prior associations; e.g. the Coca-Cola machine scene in Kubrick's Dr. Strangelove would not work with another, real or fictional, brand. Sometimes the author will use a common brand only to make the scene more natural or create a specific ambience.  More commonly, such uses are instances  of product placement – the insertion of "casual" (but actually paid and intentional) positive references to brands in movies, television programming, games, and books. However, this practice is so widespread in the entertainment industry that it gives authors another reason to avoid the use of real brands: any such reference would be suspected by the public of being paid advertising, and could diminish the artistic or intellectual merit of the work.

Another advantage to a fictional brand is that all its specifications can be invented. In this sense, an author can invent a model or brand of car, for which he can make up details. That way, he doesn't have to go look up specifications on a car, which would take time and effort-he could just make them up.

Sometimes, usually on television or movies, a real brand would not be permitted due to restrictions in advertising particular products, especially cigarettes and alcohol. Usually, a fictional brand would be created that bears some resemblance to a real brand.

Television programs made in Canada for the Canadian market are not permitted to show or mention real brand names except in certain specific circumstances. The CRTC's prohibition of product placement exists primarily to prevent producers from accepting payola, especially if accepting it affects creative control or leads producers to attempt to deceive the audience (by, for instance, implying that X Brand Olive Oil is the best brand because the host uses it). In some instances (especially cooking and home improvement shows) brand names are merely inked, taped, or edited out; in dramatic presentations, however, fake brand names may be used. The restriction does not apply to news or current affairs programs when mention of the brand is necessary to fairly and fully present the subject matter, and it does not apply to televised sporting events, where branding may be beyond the station's control. Programs produced outside of Canada are not subject to these rules.

Yet another reason to use a fictional brand is that sometimes a product is itself a major "character" in the plot, and using a real brand would limit creativity as the author would be constrained by the actual attributes of that brand. A subset of this is comedic brands, the most famous being "Acme" for the maker of complicated gadgets that never quite work.

Finally, the use of a real brand may be excluded also when the plot is meant to develop in a time or place (e.g. in a distant future, or in a fictional universe) where the real brand would not have existed anyway.  Alternately, made-up brands are often more humorous than real brands, which is why a lot of cartoons and sitcoms prefer them.

Well-known fictional brands

Finder-Spyder
Finder-Spyder is a fictional Web search engine that appears in numerous television shows, used in the same manner as the fictitious 555 telephone number in TV and film. It has been called "an unofficial, open source stand-in for Google and its competitors" (used as a legality-free alternative to a brand-name product), and "the most popular search engine in the TV universe." Finder-Spyder appears as a top 10 pick in "best fictional brand" lists by various online media, along with Oceanic Airlines, Morley cigarettes,  Acme Corporation, and others.

Morley

Morley is a fictional brand of cigarettes with packaging that resembles Marlboro cigarettes. The name "Morley" is a reference to "Marleys", a once-common nickname for Marlboro cigarettes. Television programs began using Morleys in an era where Tobacco companies were allowed to sponsor television shows and pay for product placement. If no company agreed on a deal for product placement, producers would use a non-branded product like the fictional Morleys. Morleys are produced by The Earl Hays Press, a Hollywood prop packaging service.

Wonka

In 1964, Roald Dahl wrote Charlie and the Chocolate Factory set within the fictional Wonka Chocolate Factory. The story included several fictional candy products including the Everlasting Gobstopper and the Wonka Bar. The 1971 musical Willy Wonka & the Chocolate Factory was an adaptation of Dahl's work funded by Quaker Oats who also produced a variety of Wonka candy through their subsidiary Sunline. These candy products were largely unsuccessful and Quaker sold off Sunline by 1972. Sunline continued to make Wonka branded candy and was later acquired by Nestle. Although initially involved in the musical, Dahl left the project and disowned the 1971 film. After his death, Dahl's family became involved with a second film adaptation, Charlie and the Chocolate Factory (2005). This again featured Wonka branded products.

Fictional brands lists
List of fictional beverages
List of fictional vehicles

See also
 Brand
 Trademark
 Product placement
 Brand management
 Saturday Night Live commercial – frequently featuring fictional brands, many listed with this entry

References

External links
Not a Real Thing: Sorting the Minutiae of Imaginary Worlds
Searching for a Big Kahuna Burger
Topher's List of Fictional Cereals

 
Branding terminology
Brands